The First Right of the Child is a 1932 German drama film directed by Fritz Wendhausen and starring Hertha Thiele, Eduard Wesener and Helene Fehdmer.

The film's sets were designed by the art director Erwin Scharf.

Synopsis
After becoming pregnant by her student boyfriend, struggling secretary considers her options. These include suicide before she decides that every child has the right to be loved.

Reviews 
Filmwoche (1932): "It's a women's film, but all men should see it too, the urgent demand is addressed to the entire German film audience: Watch this film and help it to win."

Cast
 Hertha Thiele as Lotte Bergmann
 Eduard Wesener as Herbert Böhme
 Helene Fehdmer as Frau Bergmann
 Erna Morena as Käthe Baumgarten - Frauenärztin
 Hermann Vallentin as Elbing
 Hedwig Schlichter as Frl. Spitz
 Lotte Stein as Frl. Müller
 Ruth Jacobsen as Frl. Lauterbach
 Traute Carlsen as Nurse
 Maria Koppenhöfer
 Emilia Unda
 Hertha von Walther
 Genia Nikolaieva
 Rotraut Richter
 Hermine Sterler
 Maria Forescu
 Eduard von Winterstein
 Erwin Kalser
 F.W. Schröder-Schrom
 Gerhard Bienert
 Hans Halder
 Ferdinand von Alten
 Heinrich Schroth
 Fritz Alberti
 Erich Bartels
 Else Ehser
 Margarete Faas
 Max Grünberg
 Oskar Höcker
 Georg John
 Wera Liessem
 Lotte Loebinger
 Marlise Ludwig
 Klaus Pohl
 Franz Stein
 Mathilde Sussin
 Elisabeth Wendt
 Hildegard Wolf

References

Bibliography

External links 
 

1932 films
1932 drama films
Films of the Weimar Republic
German drama films
1930s German-language films
Films directed by Fritz Wendhausen
German black-and-white films
1930s German films